Auslit may refer to:

AustLit: The Australian Literature Resource
Australian literature